Ribbon Hero is a video game developed by Microsoft Office Labs. The game is available as a free download and serves to educate users of Microsoft Office 2007 and 2010 how to use the ribbon interface.  It is followed by the sequel Ribbon Hero 2.

Gameplay
Ribbon Hero appears on the Ribbon in the supported Microsoft Office programs.  Once opened, it lists challenges in four sections: working with text, page design and layout, getting artistic, and quick points.  Each challenge is designed to teach the user a feature of Microsoft Office, and opens an example document which the user must edit using that feature.  Challenges can be played in any order, and give half the available points.  The remaining points are earned by using the same feature later on (outside the game).  The quick points section does not list challenges, only features which can be used outside the game to gain points.

Facebook integration
Ribbon Hero integrates with Facebook, allowing users to compare scores with their friends, and to post achievements on their Facebook Wall.  It is the first Office Labs project to include Facebook integration.

References

External links
 

2010 video games
Microsoft games
Microsoft Office-related software
Video games developed in the United States
Windows games
Windows-only games